Ab Araq (also Romanized as Āb ‘Arāq) is a village in Jaydasht Rural District, in the Central District of Firuzabad County, Fars Province, Iran. At the 2006 census, its population was 62, in 16 families.

References 

Populated places in Firuzabad County